Felsted Records was the name of two record labels. The UK version began as a subsidiary of Decca Records in July 1954 with music mainly in the jazz and dance band genres and recordings leased from the French Blue Star, Riviera, and Classique labels. The label took its name from the village where Sir Edward Lewis, the head of UK Decca, lived. The British label's only release of note was "Smokie", the first single by Bill Black's Combo, Black having been Elvis Presley's bassist, licensed from Hi Records.

Late in 1957, Felsted Records US opened, operating from London Records' office in New York and was marketed as a pop label. Releases included Kathy Linden's "Billy" and "Goodbye Jimmy, Goodbye"; Jimmy Wisner's 1961 instrumental "Asia Minor", credited to "Kokomo, his Piano and Orchestra" on the London label in the UK; and The Flares' 1961 release "Foot Stompin' Part 1", which reached No. 20 on the Black Singles chart and No. 25 on the Billboard Hot 100

In 1958 Felsted was reinstated in the UK leasing US material contracted through its US office. Neither label had much commercial success; the UK label was closed in 1964 and its roster transferred to London Records.

During 1958 and '59, British producer Stanley Dance supervised albums for Felsted in New York by Buster Bailey, Coleman Hawkins, Budd Johnson, Rex Stewart, Buddy Tate, and Dicky Wells.

Discography

7500 Popular Series

7000 Jazz Series

45 rpm singles, New York

See also
 List of record labels

References

External links
 45 rpm singles discography

British record labels
Jazz record labels
Record labels established in 1954
Record labels disestablished in 1960